Elena Vladimirovna Temnikova (born 18 April 1985) is a Russian singer, television personality and fashion designer. She came to prominence as a contestant in the talent show Star Factory and as one of the three members of the Russian girl group Serebro, which represented Russia in the Eurovision Song Contest 2007.

Career

Star Factory and early solo career: 2003–06

Temnikova started to study music when she was five years old; she was playing violin and singing in the choir. She came to media prominence as a contestant on the Channel One talent show Star Factory in 2003.

She was spotted by Maxim Fadeev, the main producer of Star Factory, and signed a recording contract with Fadeev's recording company Monolit Records.

Although Temnikova released two disco singles, "Begi" and "Taina", she did not continue her solo career, and did not release a solo album. She instead joined Serebro, a girl group formed by Fadeev. In an interview for the magazine InStyle, in February 2008, Temnikova said: "After Star Factory, Maxim Fadeev offered me a new job. He offered me to be lead singer in girl band. I decided to do it, and we together found second and third member". Olga Seryabkina and Marina Lizorkina also joined the group.

Serebro: 2007–14 

Serebro – consisting of Temnikova, Olga Seryabkina and Marina Lizorkina – represented Russia in the Eurovision Song Contest 2007 with the song "Song #1" and won the 3rd place, behind Serbia and Ukraine.

After their successful performance at the Eurovision Song Contest, Serebro has rapidly become one of the most successful artists in Russia. After "Song #1", they also released number-one singles "Дыши", "Опиум" and "Скажи, не молчи". After a release delay of their debut album, Opiumroz, it was finally released on 25 April 2009, and was presented at the band's concert in Bolshoi Theatre. Serebro was supported by other musicians, including by Russian entrant at the Eurovision Song Contest 2004 Yulia Savicheva; Opiumroz was prepared for two years.
Karpova, Seryabkina and Temnikova later released Serebro's second album "Mama Lover".

On 15 May 2014 the official Serebro website reported that Elena had left the group due to pregnancy. She was replaced with Karpova who had left the band earlier the previous year until they find a replacement.

She is now a solo artist.

Solo career: 2014–present

Personal life 
Raised in Kurgan, at the end of 2002 she moved to Omsk for few months and then to Moscow due to professional obligations.

In 2004, Temnikova married Alexei Semyonov, who was also a contestant in Star Factory. Temnikova sought separation soon after, but Semyonov would not agree to it. In the meantime, Semyonov fell in love with another woman and eventually sent Temnikova divorce papers, and the couple officially divorced after four years of marriage.

In 2014, Temnikova secretly married entrepreneur Dmitry Sergeev in the Maldives. Their daughter, Alexandra, was born on 27 March 2015.

In June 2019, Temnikova's former bandmate Olga Seryabkina came out as bisexual in an interview with the Russian tabloid Super. She did so to dispel rumors she was in a relationship with Maxim Fadeev, which were spread by Temnikova. In the interview, Seryabkina confirmed she had been in a four-year relationship with Temnikova while they were bandmates, and that the relationship was well known throughout their inner circle, but they had never confirmed it publicly.

Discography

Studio Album 

TEMNIKOVA I (2016)
TEMNIKOVA II (2017)
TEMNIKOVA III: Не модные (Not Fashionable) (2018)
TEMNIKOVA 4 (2019)
TEMNIKOVA 5: Paris (2021)

Extended plays 

Импульсы (Remix) (2016)
Выше крыш. Акустический лайв (LIVE @ Парк Горького, 2018) (2018)
TEMNIKOVA 4 (Live) (2019)

Live albums 
TEMNIKOVA PRO I (2020)

Singles

Promotional Singles

Other charting songs

Features

Music videos

References

External links
Official website
Official website of Serebro

1985 births
Living people
21st-century Russian women singers
21st-century Russian singers
Russian television personalities
Russian sopranos
Fabrika Zvyozd
People from Kurgan, Kurgan Oblast
Serebro members